Who Framed Roger Rabbit (Original Motion Picture Soundtrack) is the soundtrack album to the 1988 film Who Framed Roger Rabbit, directed by Robert Zemeckis and featured film score composed by regular Zemeckis collaborator Alan Silvestri, who conducted the London Symphony Orchestra. The musical score was heavily influenced on Carl W. Stalling's music composed for Looney Tunes. Apart from Silvestri's score, the film also features performances of "Hungarian Rhapsody", "Why Don't You Do Right?" by Amy Irving as Jessica Rabbit, "The Merry-Go-Round Broke Down" by Charles Fleischer as Roger Rabbit, and a choral version of "Smile, Darn Ya, Smile!" performed by the Toons.

The score was recorded at the CTS Studios in Wembley, London in April 1988. The soundtrack was originally released by Buena Vista Records on June 22, 1988, but immediately fell out of print after its release. It was reissued in April 2002, and since then the album saw multiple releases, including a 2018 Intrada Records' release of the film score in three-CD set, and two vinyl editions released by Mondo and Walt Disney Records in September 2019 and 2021.

The score received critical acclaim, while critics often citing it as one of "Silvestri's best scores in his career", and received Silvestri a nomination for Grammy Award for Best Score Soundtrack for Visual Media and Saturn Award for Best Music, but lost both awards to Ryuichi Sakamoto, David Byrne and Cong Su for their work in The Last Emperor (1987) and Christopher Young for Hellbound: Hellraiser II (1988).

Release history 
The album was first released by Buena Vista Records on June 22, 1988 in CD, LP and cassettes, and was again reissued in CDs on April 12, 2002, after the original album fell out of print. On January 26, 2018, Intrada Records' released a three-CD set, which includes the complete score from the film, alternates, remastered version of the original score in the first album, alongside music from three Roger Rabbit short films, composed and conducted by Bruce Broughton and James Horner. The album was reissued by Mondo and Walt Disney Records, for the official vinyl release. Mondo released the first vinyl edition of the soundtrack on September 6, 2019, which featured a 180-gram disc with pink, neon and white splatter colored edition. Another vinyl edition was released on September 10, 2021.

Critical reception 
The score has been critically acclaimed and assessed as one of Silvestri's best film scores composed. It has been listed by Den of Geek, in the eighth position of "Silvestri's 30 best soundtracks", where a review by Sean Wilson, stated "a marvel of instrumental complexity, and a personal score for Silvestri as he gets to return to his jazz roots". ClassicFM also listed it as one of "Silvestri's best film scores". Who Framed Roger Rabbit score has been considered as one of the best scores in the 1980s, by several outlets including, Variety, Far Out Magazine, MovieWeb, Collider, Flickering Myth, Empire Online and Entertainment Weekly.

Music critic Jonathan Broxton wrote "Who Framed Roger Rabbit is a landmark score in Alan Silvestri’s career, and should take pride of place in the collection of anyone who admires his music. His depiction of 1940s Hollywood through a series of original jazz pieces is wonderfully authentic, the inter-weaving character themes give the score intellectual depth, and the action writing is some of the best of Silvestri’s early career, especially when it combines his trademark orchestral flamboyance with the jazzy period riffs." Jeff Ames of Comingsoon.net called it as "a classic film score bursting with energy and playful themes made during a time when Silvestri was at the top of his game".

James Southall of Movie Wave wrote "The score is at its most coherent - and best, on album - during the far less frenetic sequences. Things are brought to a close in the madcap, end title suite, with blink-and-you'll-miss-them recaps of the major themes.  It's a score that certainly has a number of fine moments, but it's just too frenetic to be consistently enjoyable.  The good outweighs the bad enough for me to recommend it - Silvestri is a consistently impressive composer, after all - but good luck finding a copy!" Filmtracks.com wrote "the Silvestri score is a wild ride, as to be expected, but cartoon lovers will devour its shameless enthusiasm." Set the Tape wrote "Those who are fans of the composer are urged to get their hands on this release – it paints a Silvestri masterpiece in a whole new light."

Track listing

Original soundtrack

Complete score (Intrada edition)

Personnel 
Credits adapted from Allmusic

 David Bifano – production assistant
 David Braucher – design
 Chuck Domanico – bass
 Jerry Hey – trumpet
 Kenneth Karman – music editor
 London Symphony Orchestra – orchestra
 Sue Mallet – contractor
 Harvey Mason, Sr. – drums
 Steve Price – assistant Engineer
 Dennis Sands – engineer
 Stephen Schaefer – drums
 Tom Scott – saxophone
 Alan Silvestri – composer, arranger, producer
 Chet Swiatkowski – piano
 Randy Waldman – piano

Chart performance

Weekly charts

Year-end charts

Accolades

Notes

References

Further reading 

 
 Who Framed Roger Rabbit essay  by Alexis Ainsworth at National Film Registry

External links 

 

1988 soundtrack albums
1980s film soundtrack albums
Alan Silvestri soundtracks
Buena Vista Records soundtracks
Intrada Records soundtracks
Walt Disney Records soundtracks
Who Framed Roger Rabbit
London Symphony Orchestra soundtracks